Ribadedeva (Asturian and Cantabrian: Ribedeva) is a municipality in the Autonomous Community of the Principality of Asturias, Spain. To the north is the Cantabrian Sea, while to the south lies Peñamellera Baja, to the west Llanes and to the east, across the Deva River, the Autonomous Community of Cantabria.

Parishes

Colombres
Noriega
Villanueva

References

External links

Federación Asturiana de Concejos 

Municipalities in Asturias